Chin Han may refer to:

 Chin Han or Jinhan confederacy, Korean confederacy from around the 1st century BC to the 4th century AD
 Chin Han (actor, born 1938), retired Hong Kong actor originally from Mainland China, active in Hong Kong and Taiwanese cinema from 1963 to 1983
 Chin Han (actor, born 1946), Taiwanese actor originally from Mainland China, active in Taiwanese, Hong Kong and Chinese cinema from 1970 until present
 Chin Han (actor, born 1969), Singaporean actor active in Hollywood